Too Young may refer to:

Music

Albums
 Too Young (album), a 1972 album by Donny Osmond

Songs
 "Too Young" (Jack Wagner song)
 "Too Young" (Phoenix song)
 "Too Young" (Post Malone song)
 "Too Young" (Queensberry song)
 "Too Young" (Sidney Lippman and Sylvia Dee song), written by Sidney Lippman, lyrics by Sylvia Dee, first published in 1951
"Too Young", by Bear Hands from You'll Pay for This, 2016
"Too Young", by Benny Mardones from Never Run, Never Hide, 1980
"Too Young", by Louis Tomlinson from Walls, 2020
"Too Young", by Sabrina Carpenter from Eyes Wide Open, 2015

Other uses
 "Too Young" (Adventure Time), an episode of the TV series Adventure Time
 2 Young, a 2005 Hong Kong film
 Too Young, a music consultancy founded by Frederic Schindler

See also
 Too Much Too Young (disambiguation)